The First Biennium, also known as the Social-Azañist Biennium, the Reformist Biennium, or the Transformer Biennium, was the period between the proclamation of the Second Spanish Republic on April 14, 1931, and the 1933 Spanish general election.

Constituent Period (April–December 1931)

The Provisional Government of the Second Spanish Republic lasted from the Proclamation of the Republic until the formation of the first permanent government on December 15, six days after the ratification of the 1931 Spanish Constitution. Up until October 15, 1931, the Provisional Government was presided by Niceto Alcalá-Zamora, who resigned after his strong opposition to the Article 26 of the Constitution, which addressed the "religious question", Manuel Azaña followed him.

The Social-Azañist Biennium (December 1931 – September 1933)
On December 15, 1931, Azaña introduced his second government, made up entirely of leftist republicans from Republican Action, the Radical Socialist Republican Party, ORGA, and Republican Left of Catalonia. Azaña intended to implement a vast reform program in order to imitate the politics of the Restoration. These reforms also sought to solve many of the "pending questions" (the "social question", the "religious question", the "agrarian question" and the "military question" in particular). However, the reforms were met with great resistance by both social and corporate groups, who argued that the government was trying to "dismount" them from the positions they earned.

End of Azaña's government
The Azañist government's popularity peaked in autumn 1932, as it effectively contained the anarchists and defeated the monarchist uprising in the Spanish military. The General Workers' Union supported the government, despite the growing influence of the CNT. By this time, the Republic also reformed the military, public schooling, and started a big program for public works.

However, by 1933, the government surrendered to domestic and foreign pressures. The government's decline started with the anarchist insurrection, which led to the Casas Viejas incident. This led to a big plunge in the government's perceived credibility. Along with a recession and rising unemployment and the growth of National Catholicism, Azaña resigned as President of the Republic.

References

Bibliography
 
 
 
 
 
 

Second Spanish Republic
1931 in Spain
1932 in Spain
1933 in Spain
Politics of Spain